Nicola Mendelsohn CBE (née: Clyne; born 29 August 1971) is a British advertising executive. Active in the advertising industry since 1992, she was named vice-president for Europe, the Middle East and Africa for Facebook in June 2013. In 2021, Nicola was named Vice President of Meta's Global Business Group. She is also a non-executive director of Diageo. The Daily Telegraph has called her "the most powerful woman in the British tech industry". She was named in Campaign magazine's Power 100 2020 list of top marketers.

Early life and education
Nicola Sharon Clyne was born in Manchester, England. Her mother, Celia Clyne, is a kosher caterer; her father Barry Clyne is Chairman of Celia Clyne Banqueting, and her brother Mark also works in the family business.

She was a youth member of the Jewish youth organisation the BBYO (formerly the B'nai B'rith Youth Organization) and attended Manchester High School for Girls from 1982 to 1987. From 1989 to 1992 she attended the University of Leeds, graduating with a bachelor's degree in English and Theatre Studies. In her senior year, she helped raise £20,000 for Jewish causes.

Career
Mendelsohn originally planned to attend drama school and become an actress, but on a friend's recommendation decided to explore advertising instead. She was offered a graduate training scheme at Bartle Bogle Hegarty, where she worked from September 1992 to January 2004, advancing to Business Development Director. In April 2004 she became Deputy Chairman of Grey London, serving in that capacity until December 2007. She was also European Business Development Director for the Grey Communications Group from 2004 to 2008. In April 2008 she became partner and executive chairman at Karmarama, a London advertising agency.

In 2013 she was hired as Facebook Vice-President for Europe, the Middle East and Africa, ending the company's half-year search to replace outgoing VP Joanna Shields. She brings her extensive advertising and political contacts to the job, which is the company's most senior position outside the US.

Mendelsohn is a strong advocate of work–life balance and flextime for women with families. She has worked a four-day week since her first child, born during her tenure at BBH, was one year old. At Facebook, too, she works only from Monday to Thursday.

Affiliations
Mendelsohn is co-chair of the Creative Industries Council and director of the Bailey's Prize for Women's Fiction. In April 2011 she became the first female president of the Institute of Practitioners in Advertising, serving a two-year term.

In September 2014 she became a non-executive director of Diageo. Previously, she was a board director for Bartle Bogle Hegarty and the Fragrance Foundation, chairman of the corporate board of Women's Aid, trustee of The White Ribbon Alliance, and president of the Women's Advertising Club of London.

She also serves on the UK government’s Digital Economy Council, the Mayor of London’s Business Advisory Board, and is co-president of the charity Norwood

Honours and recognition
In 2015 she was made a Commander of the Order of the British Empire (CBE) for services to the creative industries as part of the 2015 Queen's Birthday Honours.

Also in 2015, Computer Weekly ranked Mendelsohn number 34 on its "50 Most Influential Women in UK IT 2015", she was named one of the Most Inspiring Women in European Tech by the Inspiring Fifty organisation, and Debrett's included her on their "People of Influence" in the Debrett's 500 2015 list.

In 2014 she was included on GQ list of the 100 Most Connected Women in Britain, and ranked number 85 on The Jewish Chronicle Power 100 list.

In 2013, she ranked number 69 on The Guardian "MediaGuardian 100 2013". In 2011 she was named one of Advertising Age "Women to Watch". In 2005 Management Today included her on its list of the top 35 women under 35 in the business world.

In 2017, she was awarded an honorary Doctorate at the University of Salford.

In 2019, Mendelsohn was 34th in Computer Weeklys 50 "Most Influential Women in UK Tech" shortlist.

Philanthropy

On World Cancer Day (4 February 2018) she made public that she had been diagnosed with follicular lymphoma, an incurable cancer of the blood. Mendelsohn said that she made the announcement to raise awareness about the cancer, describing it as not rare but little-known.

Nicola launched The Follicular Lymphoma Foundation in 2019 – a charity dedicated to funding research into the disease and supporting patients. The organization is dedicated to helping those with the condition “live well”. It will also aim to raise $20m (£15.5m) in its first three years and is hoping to find a cure to the disease within the next decade. 

Nicola runs a Facebook group called Living with Follicular Lymphoma, which has nearly 8,000 people, and spends time on the group most days. In an interview with the Sunday Times, she said her ambition is to find a cure so that the foundation won’t need to exist.

Personal
She married Jonathan Mendelsohn, a British lobbyist and Labour political organiser, in 1994. He was created a life peer as Baron Mendelsohn, of Finchley in the London Borough of Barnet in 2013. She and her husband are Jewish and are active in their synagogue and Jewish community. In November 2015 they became the new presidential couple for the Norwood Anglo-Jewish family services charity. They reside in Finchley with their three sons and one daughter.
Danny, Sam, Zac and Gabi.

Selected articles

References

External links
"Meet the Woman Heading Facebook's Huge International Growth" Time, 4 October 2014

1971 births
Living people
20th-century English businesswomen
20th-century English businesspeople
21st-century English businesswomen
21st-century English businesspeople
British baronesses
British women business executives
Businesspeople from Manchester
Commanders of the Order of the British Empire
English Jews
Facebook employees
People educated at Manchester High School for Girls
People from Finchley
Women in advertising
Alumni of the University of Leeds
Spouses of life peers